Murray McArthur (born 4 May 1966) is an English stage, television and film actor.

Early life
McArthur was born and brought up in Devon. The son of a mushroom farmer, of Scottish parentage and red-haired, he often plays Scottish roles. He attended King's School, Ottery St Mary, received a BA (Joint Hons) degree in English and Drama at Loughborough University and went on to study acting at the Drama Studio London. He was a member of the Devon County Youth Theatre.

Career
He has appeared in many stage-plays in British regional theatres and on London's West End (including the Royal National Theatre and Shakespeare's Globe). Much of his stage work has taken him overseas (Ahmanson Theatre, Los Angeles & Panasonic Globe Theatre, Tokyo). His performance as Joe Gargery in Great Expectations at the Gate Theatre, Dublin was described by Irish Independent critic Bruce Arnold: "Emphasis on the heart-warming relationship between Pip and Joe Gargery is a crucial part of the story, and the blacksmith, played by Murray McArthur in the best performance of the evening, achieves this".

Murray appeared as Hasten, the Viking who breaks the Doctor's sonic sunglasses, in episode The Girl Who Died of Doctor Who.

He also portrayed a Wildling chieftain in the fifth season episode Hardhome of the HBO series Game of Thrones. His character returned in the sixth season episode The Broken Man with the character name Dim Dalba. He speaks for the Wildlings of The Gift when asked by Jon Snow (character), Tormund Giantsbane, Sansa Stark and Davos Seaworth to join them in the battle against the forces of Ramsay Bolton.

Recently played Hákon Iron-Beard in Robert Eggers Viking revenge film The Northman, released in April 2022. Production on the film was halted due to the COVID-19 pandemic, resumed in August 2020 and finally completed in early December 2020.

In 2021 McArthur was cast as 'Dad' in the British psychological thriller Marooned Awakening. Principal photography took place in September 2021 on the island of Guernsey. The feature film  premiered at the Beau Séjour Theatre on Guernsey on 3rd September 2022and will be released in the United States and Canada on streaming services on February 21, 2023.

Murray plays the part of Fabian, a homeless man who lives in the ruins of the original pilgrim meeting house, in Tim Burton's recently released Wednesday on Netflix, where Jenna Ortega's Wednesday Addams sets Thing on him. Later on he is killed by a monster and winds up in the Jericho Morgue where Wednesday notices his missing foot.

Personal life
Married to Geraldine with two children, Orla and Freya, he lives in South East London.

Filmography

Film

Television

Stage

References

 Variety (30 March 2015). "Game of Thrones’ Actress Maisie Williams to Guest Star on ‘Doctor Who’", Variety. Retrieved 30 March 2015.
 Radio Times (12 October 2015). "Doctor Who Series 9 Episode 5 The Girl Who Died", Radio Times. Retrieved 12 October 2015.
 BBC Media Centre (30 March 2015). "Doctor Who reveals Maisie Williams as guest star", BBC. Retrieved 30 March 2015.

External links

Murray McArthur – 42pm Client
BBC One – Doctor Who, Series 9, The Girl Who Died
BBC One – Doctors, Series 19, A Safe Place
  at HBO.com
 
  at HBO.com
 
  Barbarians Rising at History Channel

English male television actors
English people of Scottish descent
English male film actors
People from Honiton
1966 births
Living people
Alumni of the Drama Studio London
Alumni of Loughborough University
Male actors from Devon